Sokolovsky is a masculine Russian surname, with feminine form Sokolovskaya. Derived from the word sokol, "falcon". Polish form: Sokołowski, Lithianian: Sakalauskas, Latvian: Sokolovskis, Belarusian: Sakałoŭski/Sakalowski.

Notable people with this surname include:

People
Aleksandra Sokolovskaya (1872 – c. 1938), Russian revolutionary; wife of Leon Trotsky
Andriy Sokolovskyy (born 1978), Ukrainian high jumper
Aron Sokolovsky (born 1884), Menshevik
Denys Sokolovskyi (born 1979), retired Ukrainian professional association football player
Evgeny Sokolovsky (born 1978), Ukrainian racing driver
 (1925–1998), Czech television director (Muž na radnici)
Grigori Sokolovsky (born 1973), Russian footballer
Irina Sokolovskaya (born 1983), Russian basketball player
Mikhail Sokolovsky (disambiguation), multiple people
Mykhaylo Sokolovsky (born 1951), Ukrainian professional football coach and a former player
Vasily Sokolovsky (1897–1968), Soviet military commander
Vlad Sokolovsky (born 1991), Russian singer
Yuri Sokolovsky (born 1995), Ukrainian footballer

See also
 Sokolov (surname)

Russian-language surnames